Fenestraria (known as babies' toes or window plant) is a (possibly monotypic) genus of succulent plants in the family Aizoaceae, native to the Namaqualand in Namibia.

Description
 

The only species currently recognised in this genus is Fenestraria rhopalophylla. 
Each leaf has an epidermal window, a transparent window-like area, at its rounded tip, it is for these window-like structures that the genus is named (Latin: fenestra).

Fenestraria rhopalophylla appears very similar to Frithia pulchra, though the leaves are a slightly different shape and F. rhopalophylla has yellow flowers, compared to the pink flowers of F. pulchra.

Distribution and habitat
In the wild, the plant commonly grows under sand, except for the transparent tips, which allow light into the leaves for photosynthesis. 
The plant produces optical fibers made from crystalline oxalic acid which transmit light to subterranean photosynthetic sites.

Fenestraria rhopalophylla is native to Namaqualand in southern Africa and to Namibia. The plants generally grow in sandy or calciferous soils under low < 100 mm rainfall, that occurs in the winter.

Subspecies
 F. rhopalophylla subsp. rhopalophylla with white flowers in autumn
 F. rhopalophylla subsp. aurantiaca (=*F. aurantiaca) with yellow flowers

The status of Fenestraria aurantiaca is under review to determine whether its proper status is that of a full species or a subspecies of Fenestraria rhopalophylla.

References

Aizoaceae
Aizoaceae genera
Monotypic Caryophyllales genera
Flora of Namibia
Taxa named by N. E. Brown